The 1992 Rolex 24 at Daytona was a 24-hour endurance sports car race held on February 1–2, 1992 at the Daytona International Speedway road course. The race served as the opening round of the 1992 IMSA GT Championship.

Victory overall and in the LM class went to the No. 23 Nissan Motorsport International Nissan R91CP driven by Masahiro Hasemi, Kazuyoshi Hoshino, Toshio Suzuki. Victory in the GTP class went to the No. 2 Jaguar Racing Jaguar XJR-12 driven by Davy Jones, Scott Pruett, David Brabham, and Scott Goodyear. Victory in the Lights class went to the No. 49 Comptech Racing Spice SE91P driven by Parker Johnstone, Steve Cameron, Jimmy Vasser, and Dan Marvin. The GTS class was won by the No. 15 Roush Racing Ford Mustang driven by Dorsey Schroeder, Wally Dallenbach Jr., and Robby Gordon. Finally, the GTU class was won by the No. 82 Dick Greer Racing Mazda RX-7 driven by Al Bacon, Dick Greer, Mike Mees, and Peter Uria. Notably, the GTU class winner finished 7th overall, ahead of GTS class winner, one of the best finishes for a GTU entry during that era.

Race results
Class winners in bold.

References

24 Hours of Daytona
1992 in sports in Florida
1992 in American motorsport